Tokuji is a masculine Japanese given name.

Possible writings
Tokuji can be written using different combinations of kanji characters. Some examples:

徳次, "benevolence, next"
徳治, "benevolence, manage/cure"
徳二, "benevolence, two"
徳児, "benevolence, child"
徳爾, "benevolence, you"
徳慈, "benevolence, mercy"
得次, "gain, next"
得治, "gain, manage/cure"
得二, "gain, two"
篤次, "sincere, next"
竺次, "bamboo, next"
啄次, "peck, next"

The name can also be written in hiragana とくじ or katakana トクジ.

Notable people with the name
, Japanese businessman
, Japanese baseball player and manager
, Japanese judge
, Japanese businessman

Japanese masculine given names